Major General Arthur Wollaston Bartholomew,  (5 May 1878 – 29 January 1945) was a senior British Army officer who served as Commander of British Troops in China from 1935 to 1938.

Military career
Bartholomew was commissioned into the Royal Artillery as a second lieutenant on 26 May 1900 and promoted to lieutenant on 19 March 1902.

He was a keen cricketer and played for Berkshire County Cricket Club in the Minor Counties Championship.

He became an Adjutant in 1910 and then served in the First World War, initially as a Brigade Major and then as a General Staff Officer.

In 1929 he became an instructor at the Senior Officers' School and in 1931 he was made Commander Royal Artillery for 4th Division Then in 1933 he was appointed Inspector of the Royal Artillery.

He became Commander of British Troops in China in 1935. He retired in 1938 and became Lieutenant of the Tower of London. He was also Colonel Commandant of the Royal Artillery from 1942 until his death and Aide-de-Camp to King George V.

He lived at The Manor House in Ottery St Mary in Devon.

References

External links

1878 births
1945 deaths
British Army major generals
Royal Artillery officers
Companions of the Order of the Bath
Companions of the Order of St Michael and St George
Commanders of the Order of the British Empire
Companions of the Distinguished Service Order
English cricketers
Berkshire cricketers
British Army personnel of World War I
British expatriates in China